The 1954 Indiana Hoosiers football team represented the Indiana Hoosiers in the 1954 Big Ten Conference football season. The Hoosiers played their home games at Memorial Stadium in Bloomington, Indiana. The team was coached by Bernie Crimmins, in his third year as head coach of the Hoosiers.

Schedule

1955 NFL draftees

References

Indiana
Indiana Hoosiers football seasons
Indiana Hoosiers football